K-1 World Grand Prix 2002 Final was a kickboxing event promoted by the K-1. The event was held at the Tokyo Dome in Tokyo, Japan on Saturday, December 7, 2002 in front of 74,500 spectators. It was the tenth K-1 World Grand Prix final, involving ten of the world's top fighters (two being reservists), with all bouts fought under K-1 Rules (100 kg/156-220 lbs).  The eight finalists had almost all qualified via preliminary events, while two additional fighters were invited as reserve fighters (for more detail on this see bulleted list below).  In total there were ten fighters at the event, representing eight countries.

The tournament winner was Ernesto Hoost who won his fourth and final K-1 World Grand Prix by defeating Jérôme Le Banner in the final by third round knockout. Jérôme Le Banner would be making his second appearance in the final, which he so far been unable to win, and the defeat was made even worse as it left him with a broken arm which nearly ended his career.  

Ernesto Hoost was knocked out of this K-1 World Grand Prix twice (taking into account the Final Elimination) - both times by Bob Sapp - but managed to proceed due to injuries to other fighters.  

Qualifiers - Finalists
Peter Aerts - Won fight at K-1 World Grand Prix 2002 Final Elimination
Jérôme Le Banner - Won fight at K-1 World Grand Prix 2002 Final Elimination
Ernesto Hoost - Invitee, called up to replace Semmy Schilt who was injured
Mark Hunt - Won fight at K-1 World Grand Prix 2002 Final Elimination
Stefan Leko - Won fight at K-1 World Grand Prix 2002 Final Elimination
Musashi - K-1 Andy Spirits Japan GP 2002 Final winner
Bob Sapp - Won fight at K-1 World Grand Prix 2002 Final Elimination
Ray Sefo - Won fight at K-1 World Grand Prix 2002 Final Elimination

Qualifiers - Reservists
Martin Holm - Invitee
Michael McDonald - Invitee

Tournament bracket

* Ernesto Hoost replaced Semmy Schilt in the Quarter Finals as Semmy Schilt was injured

** Ernesto Hoost replaced Bob Sapp in the Semi Finals as Bob Sapp was injured

Results

See also
List of K-1 events
List of K-1 champions
List of male kickboxers

References

External links
K-1sport.de - Your Source for Everything K-1
K-1 Official Website

K-1 events
2002 in kickboxing
Kickboxing in Japan
Sports competitions in Tokyo